

CRRL Cup (First Grade) 
The 2020 CRRL will be the 1st season of the cup, the top division Rugby League club competition in Canberra. The 2020 competition was renamed due to the competition being given amateur status for 2020. The 2020 CRRL Cup will consist of 9 regular season rounds that will begin on the 25th of July and end on the 20th of September. There will be a Grand Final to decide the premiers, which will be played on the 27th of September. Queanbeyan United Blues are the defending premiers.

Teams 
There will be 4 teams playing in 2020, 5 less than 2019 due to the COVID-19 pandemic. there will be 3 teams from Canberra and 1 from Queanbeyan

3 of the 4 clubs will field a team in the reserve grade competition.

Ladder

Ladder Progression 

 Numbers highlighted in green indicate that the team finished the round inside the top 2.
 Numbers highlighted in blue indicates the team finished first on the ladder in that round.
 Numbers highlighted in red indicates the team finished last place on the ladder in that round.

Season Results

Round 1

Round 2

Round 3

Round 4

Round 5

Round 6

Round 7

Round 8

Round 9

Grand Final

George Tooke Shield (Second Division)

Teams

Ladder

Ladder Progression 

 Numbers highlighted in green indicate that the team finished the round inside the top 2.
 Numbers highlighted in blue indicates the team finished first on the ladder in that round.
 Numbers highlighted in red indicates the team finished last place on the ladder in that round.

Season Results

Round 1

Round 2

Round 3

Round 4

Round 5

Round 6

Round 7

Round 8

Round 9

Grand Final

Lower Grade Competition Results

Reserve Grade

Ladder

Grand Final

Ladies League Tag

Ladder

Grand Final

Ladies League Tag Second Division

Ladder

Grand Final

Women's

Ladder

Grand Final

Junior Competition Results

Under 17s

Finals Series

Under 16s

Division 1 Finals Series

Division 2 Finals Series

Under 18s Girls

Finals Series

Under 15s Girls

Finals Series

Under 15s

Division 1 Finals Series

Division 2 Finals Series

Under 14s Division 1

Finals Series

Under 14s Division 2

Finals Series

Under 13s Division 1

Finals Series

Under 13s Division 2

Finals Series

Under 13s Division 3

Finals Series

References

2020 in Australian rugby league